Hesperumia is a genus of moths in the family Geometridae. The genus was described by Packard in 1873.

Species
Hesperumia sulphuraria Packard, 1873
Hesperumia fumosaria Comstock, 1937
Hesperumia latipennis (Hulst, 1896)
Hesperumia fumida (Warren, 1904)

References

Boarmiini